American singer Bebe Rexha has released two studio albums, three extended plays, 29 singles (including nine as featured artist), five promotional singles, and twenty-two music videos. Rexha released "I Can't Stop Drinking About You" as her debut single in 2014, followed by "I'm Gonna Show You Crazy", which was certified Platinum by the Swedish Recording Industry Association (GLF). Both releases were included on I Don't Wanna Grow Up (2015), the singer's first extended play. In 2015, Rexha collaborated with G-Eazy for her breakthrough single "Me, Myself & I", which experienced widespread success worldwide and was awarded multi-Platinum certifications in several countries.

Similar success was achieved with the subsequent singles, "In the Name of Love" (2016) with Martin Garrix and "I Got You" (2016). From February to August 2017, the singer released another two extended plays, All Your Fault: Pt. 1 and All Your Fault: Pt. 2. The latter spawned the single "Meant to Be" featuring country duo Florida Georgia Line and became the singer's highest-peaking single in several countries. The song is also included on her debut studio album, Expectations, which was released on June 22, 2018. She had also been featured on multiple successful singles, including "Take Me Home" (2013) by Cash Cash, "Hey Mama" (2015) by David Guetta, "Back to You" (2017) by Louis Tomlinson and "Call You Mine" (2019) by the Chainsmokers while having writing credits on various songs.

Studio albums

Extended plays

Singles

As lead artist

As featured artist

Promotional singles

Other charted songs

Other appearances

Music videos

Writing credits
Rexha has co-written for a number of artists, including:

Notes

References 

Discography
Discographies of American artists
Pop music discographies